Gilbert F. Smith (March 18, 1846 - ?) was a potter, cattleman, and banker who served as a state legislator in Idaho. He was elected to the legislature in 1894 and then the Idaho Senate. He represented Washington County, Idaho.

He was born in Ohio to Henry, a native of Ireland, and Mary née Gilbert Smith. He had nine siblings. He served during the American Civil War. He became a potter before moving to Idaho. He raised cattle and owned property. He sold his cattle ranching business and removed to Meadows Valley, Idaho where he was president of Meadows Valley Bank.

References

This draft is in progress as of October 18, 2022.

People from Adams County, Idaho

1846 births
Year of death missing
19th-century American politicians
20th-century American politicians
American people of Irish descent
Members of the Idaho House of Representatives
People of Ohio in the American Civil War
Idaho state senators
American cattlemen
American potters
People from Washington County, Idaho